Malinovka is a rural locality (a settlement) and the administrative center of Desyatukhovsky Rural Settlement, Starodubsky District, Bryansk Oblast, Russia. The population was 5 as of 2010. There is 1 street.

Geography 
Malinovka is located 46 km south of Starodub (the district's administrative centre) by road. Azarovka is the nearest rural locality.

References 

Rural localities in Starodubsky District